Elliot Hill is a mountain in the Central New York Region of New York. It is located east of Gothicville, New York.

References

Mountains of Otsego County, New York
Mountains of New York (state)